The Tampa Bay Rays 2018 season was the Rays' 21st season of Major League Baseball, and the 11th as the "Rays" (all at Tropicana Field). The Rays played this season with few starting pitchers. Many games were started by pitchers normally used in relief, referred to as openers. This approach saw the Rays set MLB single season records for most no decisions by starters (91) and most wins by relievers (55). They finished the season with a 90–72 record, their first winning season since 2013; however, for the fifth consecutive year, they failed to make the postseason. This was because the Red Sox had 108 wins for the division title, while the Yankees had 100 wins and the Athletics had 97 wins for the wild card.

Offseason
On December 11, 2017, the Rays acquired Joey Wendle in a trade in exchange for a player to be named later. One day later, the Rays traded minor leaguer Deion Tansel to the San Diego Padres for Ryan Schimpf.

On December 20, 2017, the Rays traded longtime franchise player Evan Longoria to the San Francisco Giants for Denard Span, Christian Arroyo, and two other prospects.

On February 21, 2018, the Rays were involved in a three team trade, trading Steven Souza Jr. to the Arizona Diamondbacks and receiving Anthony Banda and two players to be named later, from the Diamondbacks and Nick Solak from the New York Yankees. The next day, the Rays traded Corey Dickerson to the Pittsburgh Pirates for Daniel Hudson, minor leaguer Tristan Gray, and $1 million.

Season standings

American League East

American League Wild Card

Record against opponents

Detailed records

Game log

|-style="background:#bfb"
| 1 || March 29 || Red Sox || 6–4 || Pruitt (1–0) || Smith (0–1) || Colomé (1) || 31,042 || 1–0 || W1
|-style="background:#fbb"
| 2 || March 30 || Red Sox || 0–1 || Price (1–0) || Roe (0–1) || Kimbrel (1) || 19,203 || 1–1 || L1
|-style="background:#fbb"
| 3 || March 31 || Red Sox || 2–3 || Porcello (1–0) || Kittredge (0–1) || Kimbrel (2) || 17,838 || 1–2 || L2
|-

|-style="background:#fbb"
| 4 || April 1 || Red Sox || 1–2 || Velázquez (1–0) || Alvarado (0–1) || Kelly (1) || 14,256 || 1–3 || L3
|-style="background:#bbb"
| — || April 2 || @ Yankees || colspan=7|Postponed (snow); Makeup: April 3
|-style="background:#fbb"
| 5 || April 3 || @ Yankees || 4–11 || Kahnle (1–0) || Pruitt (1–1) || — || 46,776 || 1–4 || L4
|-style="background:#fbb"
| 6 || April 4 || @ Yankees || 2–7 || Severino (2–0) || Snell (0–1) || — || 40,028 || 1–5 || L5
|-style="background:#fbb"
| 7 || April 5 || @ Red Sox || 2–3  || Poyner (1–0) || Kittredge (0–2) || — || 36,134 || 1–6 || L6
|-style="background:#fbb"
| 8 || April 7 || @ Red Sox || 3–10 || Porcello (2–0) || Faria (0–1) || — || 31,821 || 1–7 || L7
|-style="background:#fbb"
| 9 || April 8 || @ Red Sox || 7–8 || Smith (1–1) || Colomé (0–1) || Kimbrel (3) || 31,979 || 1–8 || L8
|-style="background:#bfb"
| 10 || April 9 || @ White Sox || 5–4 || Archer (1–0) || González (0–2) || Colomé (2) || 10,377 || 2–8 || W1
|-style="background:#bfb"
| 11 || April 10 || @ White Sox || 6–5 || Snell (1–1) || Fulmer (0–1) || Colomé (3) || 10,069 || 3–8 || W2
|-style="background:#fbb"
| 12 || April 11 || @ White Sox || 1–2 || Rondón (1–0) || Pruitt (1–2) || Jones (1) || 10,431 || 3–9 || L1
|-style="background:#fbb"
| 13 || April 13 || Phillies || 1–2 || Ramos (1–0) || Colomé (0–2) || Neris (2) || 13,372 || 3–10 || L2
|-style="background:#fbb"
| 14 || April 14 || Phillies || 4–9 || Arrieta (1–0) || Archer (1–1) || — || 20,934 || 3–11 || L3
|-style="background:#fbb"
| 15 || April 15 || Phillies || 4–10 || Ríos (1–0) || Yarbrough (0–1) || — || 19,841 || 3–12 || L4
|-style="background:#bfb"
| 16 || April 16 || Rangers || 8–4 || Snell (2–1) || Pérez (1–2) || — || 9,363 || 4–12 || W1
|-style="background:#fbb"
| 17 || April 17 || Rangers || 2–7 || Moore (1–3) || Chirinos (0–1) || — || 8,972 || 4–13 || L1
|-style="background:#bfb"
| 18 || April 18 || Rangers || 4–2 || Faria (1–1) || Hamels (1–3) || Colomé (4) || 8,657 || 5–13 || W1
|-style="background:#bfb"
| 19 || April 20 || Twins || 8–7  || Colomé (1–2) || Duke (1–1) || — || 9,786 || 6–13 || W2
|-style="background:#bfb"
| 20 || April 21 || Twins || 10–1 || Snell (3–1) || Gibson (1–1) || — || 10,106 || 7–13 || W3
|-style="background:#bfb"
| 21 || April 22 || Twins || 8–6 || Colomé (2–2) || Reed (0–1) || — || 12,515 || 8–13 || W4
|-style="background:#bbb"
| — || April 24 || @ Orioles || colspan=7|Postponed (rain); Makeup: May 12
|-style="background:#bfb"
| 22 || April 25 || @ Orioles || 8–4 || Kittredge (1–2) || Cobb (0–3) || — || 8,730 || 9–13 || W5
|-style="background:#bfb"
| 23 || April 26 || @ Orioles || 9–5 || Archer (2–1) || Bundy (1–3) || — || 9,596 || 10–13 || W6
|-style="background:#bfb"
| 24 || April 27 || @ Red Sox || 4–3 || Snell (4–1) || Pomeranz (0–1) || Colomé (5) || 32,620 || 11–13 || W7
|-style="background:#bfb"
| 25 || April 28 || @ Red Sox || 12–6 || Yarbrough (1–1) || Price (2–3) || — || 35,795 || 12–13 || W8
|-style="background:#fbb"
| 26 || April 29 || @ Red Sox || 3–4 || Kimbrel (1–1) || Colomé (2–3) || — || 32,888 || 12–14 || L1
|-style="background:#bfb"
| 27 || April 30 || @ Tigers || 3–2 || Faria (2–1) || Grene (1–2) || Alvarado (1) || 19,398 || 13–14 || W1
|-

|-style="background:#fbb"
| 28 || May 1 || @ Tigers || 1–2 || Boyd (1–2) || Archer (2–2) || Greene (5) || 17,255 || 13–15 || L1
|-style="background:#fbb"
| 29 || May 2 || @ Tigers || 2–3 (12) || Saupold (1–0)|| Andriese (0–1) || — || 20,866 || 13–16 || L2
|-style="background:#bfb"
| 30 || May 4 || Blue Jays || 6–2 || Yarbrough (2–1) || Happ (4–2) || — || 11,117 || 14–16 || W1
|-style="background:#bfb"
| 31 || May 5 || Blue Jays || 5–3 || Faria (3–1) || Sanchez (2–3) || Colomé (6) || 16,297 || 15–16 || W2
|-style="background:#fbb"
| 32 || May 6 || Blue Jays || 1–2 || Tepera (2–1) || Colomé (2–4) || Osuna (9) || 14,032 || 15–17 || L1
|-style="background:#fbb"
| 33 || May 8 || Braves || 0–1 || Newcomb (3–1) || Snell (4–2) || Vizcaíno (5) || 15,382 || 15–18 || L2
|-style="background:#fbb"
| 34 || May 9 || Braves || 2–5 || Teherán (3–1) || Yarbrough (2–2) || Vizcaíno (6) || 12,082 || 15–19 || L3
|-style="background:#fbb"
| 35 || May 11 || @ Orioles || 4–9 || Gausman (3–2) || Faria (3–2) || Brach (5) || 28,170 || 15–20 || L4
|-style="background:#fbb"
| 36 || May 12  || @ Orioles || 3–6 || Hess (1–0) || Archer (2–3) || Givens (1) || 24,534 || 15–21 || L5
|-style="background:#bfb"
| 37 || May 12  || @ Orioles || 10–3 || Romo (1–0) || Cobb (0–5) || — || 24,534 || 16–21 || W1
|-style="background:#fbb"
| 38 || May 13 || @ Orioles || 1–17 || Bundy (2–5) || Snell (4–3) || — || 25,257 || 16–22 || L1
|-style="background:#bfb"
| 39 || May 14 || @ Royals || 2–1 || Yarbrough (3–2) || Skoglund (1–3) || Colomé (7) || 14,174 || 17–22 || W1
|-style="background:#bfb"
| 40 || May 15 || @ Royals || 6–5 || Venters (1–0) || Herrera (1–1) || Colomé (8) || 21,500 || 18–22 || W2
|-style="background:#bfb"
| 41 || May 16 || @ Royals || 5–3 || Andriese (1–1) || Hammel (0–5) || Colomé (9) || 19,611 || 19–22 || W3
|-style="background:#bfb"
| 42 || May 17 || @ Angels || 7–1 || Archer (3–3) || Skaggs   (3–3) || — || 30,487 || 20–22 || W4
|-style="background:#bfb"
| 43 || May 18 || @ Angels || 8–3 || Snell (5–3) || Tropeano (1–3) || — || 40,067 || 21–22 || W5
|-style="background:#bfb"
| 44 || May 19 || @ Angels || 5–3 || Yarbrough (4–2) || Heaney (2–3) || Colomé (10) || 37,232 || 22–22 || W6
|-style="background:#fbb"
| 45 || May 20 || @ Angels || 2–5 || Ohtani (4–1) || Andriese (1–2) || Parker (2) || 38,560 || 22–23 || L1
|-style="background:#fbb"
| 46 || May 22 || Red Sox || 2–4 || Sale (5–1) || Faria (3–3) || Kimbrel (14) || 10,642 || 22–24 || L2
|-style="background:#fbb"
| 47 || May 23 || Red Sox || 1–4 || Kelly (3–0) || Colomé (2–5) || Kimbrel (15) || 10,194 || 22–25 || L3
|-style="background:#bfb"
| 48 || May 24 || Red Sox || 6–3 || Snell (6–3) || Porcello (6–2) || Colomé (11) || 12,468 || 23–25 || W1
|-style="background:#fbb"
| 49 || May 25 || Orioles || 0–2 || Hess (2–1) || Romo (1–1) || Brach (8) || 11,354 || 23–26 || L1
|-style="background:#bfb"
| 50 || May 26 || Orioles || 5–1 || Banda (1–0) || Cashner (2–6) || — || 14,744 || 24–26 || W1
|-style="background:#bfb"
| 51 || May 27 || Orioles || 8–3 || Nuño (1–0) || Gausman (3–4) || Pruitt (1) || 13,311 || 25–26 || W2
|-style="background:#bfb"
| 52 || May 28 || @ Athletics || 1–0 (13) || Stanek (1–0) || Hatcher (3–2) || Venters (1) || 10,881 || 26–26 || W3
|-style="background:#bfb"
| 53 || May 29 || @ Athletics || 4–3 || Snell (7–3) || Gossett (0–3) || Romo (1) || 7,521 || 27–26 || W4
|-style="background:#bfb"
| 54 || May 30 || @ Athletics || 6–0 || Eovaldi (1–0) || Manaea (5–6) || — || 6,705 || 28–26 || W5
|-style="background:#fbb"
| 55 || May 31 || @ Athletics || 3–7 || Mengden (6–4) || Stanek (1–1) || Treinen (13) || 12,070 || 28–27 || L1
|-

|-style="background:#fbb"
| 56 || June 1 || @ Mariners || 3–4 (13) || Elías (1–0) || Andriese (1–3) || — || 22,636 || 28–28 || L2
|-style="background:#fbb"
| 57 || June 2 || @ Mariners || 1–3 || Gonzales (6–3) || Archer (3–4) || Díaz (20) || 28,599 || 28–29 || L3
|-style="background:#fbb"
| 58 || June 3 || @ Mariners || 1–2 || Hernandez (6–4) || Alvarado (0–2) || Díaz (21) || 26,567 || 28–30 || L4
|-style="background:#fbb"
| 59 || June 5 || @ Nationals || 2–4 || Scherzer (10–1) || Eovaldi (1–1) || Doolittle (15) || 32,165 || 28–31 || L5
|-style="background:#fbb"
| 60 || June 6 || @ Nationals || 2–11 || Roark (3–6) || Venters (1–1) || — || 33,106 || 28–32 || L6
|-style="background:#fbb"
| 61 || June 7 || Mariners || 4–5 || Leake (6–3) || Pruitt (1–3) || — || 10,342 || 28–33 || L7
|-style="background:#fbb"
| 62 || June 8 || Mariners || 3–4 || Gonzales (7–3) || Font (0–3) || Díaz (22) || 12,435 || 28–34 || L8
|-style="background:#bfb"
| 63 || June 9 || Mariners || 7–3 || Snell (8–3)  || Hernandez (6–5) || Roe (1) || 12,258 || 29–34 || W1
|-style="background:#fbb"
| 64 || June 10 || Mariners || 4–5 || Paxton (6–1) || Alvarado (0–3) || Díaz (23) || 10,512 || 29–35 || L1
|-style="background:#bfb"
| 65 || June 11 || Blue Jays || 8–4 || Yarbrough (5–2) || Gaviglio (2–2) || — || 10,769 || 30–35 || W1
|-style="background:#bfb"
| 66 || June 12 || Blue Jays || 4–1 || Pruitt (2–3) || García (2–5) || Romo (2) || 11,162 || 31–35 || W2
|-style="background:#bfb"
| 67 || June 13 || Blue Jays || 1–0 || Castillo (1–0) || Tepera (3–2) || — || 10,847 || 32–35 || W3
|-style="background:#fbb"
| 68 || June 14 || @ Yankees || 3–4 || Germán (1–4) || Snell (8–4) || Chapman (19) || 45,066 || 32–36 || L1
|-style="background:#fbb"
| 69 || June 15 || @ Yankees || 0–5 || Loáisiga (1–0) || Eovaldi (1–2) || — || 45,112 || 32–37 || L2
|-style="background:#fbb"
| 70 || June 16 || @ Yankees || 1–4 || Severino (10–2) || Yarbrough (5–3) || Chapman (20) || 46,249 || 32–38 || L3
|-style="background:#bfb"
| 71 || June 17 || @ Yankees || 3–1 || Roe (1–1) || Sabathia (4–2) || Romo (3) || 46,400 || 33–38 || W1
|-style="background:#fbb"
| 72 || June 18 || @ Astros || 4–5 || McHugh (2–0) || Romo (1–2) || — || 34,151 || 33–39 || L1
|-style="background:#bfb"
| 73 || June 19 || @ Astros || 2–1 || Snell (9–4) || Rondón (1–2) || Romo (4) || 37,414 || 34–39 || W1
|-style="background:#fbb"
| 74 || June 20 || @ Astros || 1–5 || Morton (9–1) || Eovaldi (1–3) || — || 43,409 || 34–40 || L1
|-style="background:#bfb"
| 75 || June 22 || Yankees || 2–1 || Yarbrough (6–3) || Sabathia (4–3) || Romo (5) || 27,252 || 35–40 || W1
|-style="background:#bfb"
| 76 || June 23 || Yankees || 4–0 || Font (1–3) || Gray (5–5) || — || 29,831 || 36–40 || W2
|-style="background:#bfb"
| 77 || June 24 || Yankees || 7–6 (12) || Yarbrough (7–3) || Shreve (2–2) || — || 23,667 || 37–40 || W3
|-style="background:#bfb"
| 78 || June 25 || Nationals || 11–0 || Snell (10–4) || González (6–5) || — || 13,624 || 38–40 || W4
|-style="background:#bfb"
| 79 || June 26 || Nationals || 1–0 || Eovaldi (2–3) || Scherzer (10–4) || Romo (6) || 14,289 || 39–40 || W5
|-style="background:#fbb"
| 80 || June 28 || Astros || 0–1 || McCullers Jr. (9–3) || Yarbrough (7–4) || Rondón (5) || 12,305 || 39–41 || L1
|-style="background:#bfb"
| 81 || June 29 || Astros || 3–2 || Font (2–3) || Cole (9–2) || Alvarado (2) ||  || 40–41 || W1
|-style="background:#bfb"
| 82 || June 30 || Astros || 5–2 || Nuño (2–0) || Verlander (9–4) || Romo (7) || 18,378 || 41–41 || W2
|-

|-style="background:#bfb"
| 83 || July 1 || Astros || 3–2 || Snell (11–4) || Morton (10–2) || Romo (8) || 19,334 || 42–41 || W3
|-style="background:#fbb"
| 84 || July 2 || @ Marlins || 2–3 (10) || Rucinski (3–1) || Stanek (1–2) || — || 6,004 || 42–42 || L1
|-style="background:#bfb"
| 85 || July 3 || @ Marlins || 9–6 (16) || Nuño (3–0) || Graves (0–1) || Alvarado (3) || 6,259 || 43–42 || W1
|-style="background:#fbb"
| 86 || July 4 || @ Marlins || 0–3 || Rucinski (4–1) || Weber (0–1) || Ziegler (10) || 7,572 || 43–43 || L1
|-style="background:#fbb"
| 87 || July 6 || @ Mets || 1–5 || Familia (4–4) || Roe (1–2) || — || 24,236 || 43–44 || L2
|-style="background:#bfb"
| 88 || July 7 || @ Mets || 3–0 || Snell (12–4) || Matz (4–6) || Romo (9) || 32,986 || 44–44 || W1
|-style="background:#bfb"
| 89 || July 8 || @ Mets || 9–0 || Eovaldi (3–3) || Flexen (0–2) || — || 24,653 || 45–44 || W2
|-style="background:#bfb"
| 90 || July 9 || Tigers || 10–9 (10) || Andriese (2–3) || Hardy (3–2) || — || 14,229 || 46–44 || W3
|-style="background:#bfb"
| 91 || July 10 || Tigers || 5–2 || Alvarado (1–3) || Boyd (4–8) || Romo (10) || 13,478 || 47–44 || W4
|-style="background:#bfb"
| 92 || July 11 || Tigers || 4–2 || Yarbrough (8–4) || Zimmermann (4–1) || Romo (11) || 13,922 || 48–44 || W5
|-style="background:#fbb"
| 93 || July 12 || @ Twins || 1–5 || Gibson (4–6) || Snell (12–5) || Rodney (21) || 25,281 || 48–45 || L1
|-style="background:#fbb"
| 94 || July 13 || @ Twins || 8–11 || Hildenberger (2–2) || Eovaldi (3–4) || — || 28,756 || 48–46 || L2
|-style="background:#bfb"
| 95 || July 14 || @ Twins || 19–6 || Schultz (1–0) || Duke (3–3) || — || 25,094 || 49–46 || W1
|-style="background:#fbb"
| 96 || July 15 || @ Twins || 7–11 (10) || Busenitz (3–0) || Andriese (2–4) || — || 25,561 || 49–47 || L1
|- style="text-align:center; background:#bbcaff;"
| colspan="10" | 89th All-Star Game in Washington, D.C.
|-style="background:#fbb"
| 97 || July 20 || Marlins || 5–6 || Straily (4–4) || Castillo (1–1) || Conley (1) || 13,248 || 49–48 || L2
|-style="background:#fbb"
| 98 || July 21 || Marlins || 2–3 || López (2–1) || Yarbrough (8–5) || Barraclough (10) || 13,808 || 49–49 || L3
|-style="background:#bfb"
| 99 || July 22 || Marlins || 6–4 || Kolarek (1–0) || Barraclough (0–4) || — || 11,828 || 50–49 || W1
|-style="background:#bfb"
| 100 || July 23 || Yankees || 7–6 || Andriese (3–4) || Severino (14–3) || Alvarado (4) || 14,670 || 51–49 || W2
|-style="background:#fbb"
| 101 || July 24 || Yankees || 0–4 || Tanaka (8–2) || Chirinos (0–2) || — || 19,579 || 51–50 || L1
|-style="background:#bfb"
| 102 || July 25 || Yankees || 3–2 || Castillo (2–1) || Cessa (1–2) || Romo (12) || 27,372 || 52–50 || W1
|-style="background:#bfb"
| 103 || July 26 || @ Orioles || 4–3 || Yarbrough (9–5) || Cobb (2–14) || Pruitt (2) || 19,025 || 53–50 || W2
|-style="background:#fbb"
| 104 || July 27 || @ Orioles || 5–15 || Cashner (3–9) || Archer (3–5) || — || 15,649 || 53–51 || L1
|-style="background:#fbb"
| 105 || July 28 || @ Orioles || 2–11 || Gausman (5–8) || Stanek (1–3) || — || 21,526 || 53–52 || L2
|-style="background:#fbb"
| 106 || July 29 || @ Orioles || 5–11 || Bundy (7–9) || Chirinos (0–3) || — || 22,454 || 53–53 || L3
|-style="background:#bfb"
| 107 || July 31 || Angels || 10–6 || Yarbrough (10–5) || Skaggs (8–7) || — || 15,858 || 54–53 || W1
|-

|-style="background:#bfb"
| 108 || August 1 || Angels || 7–2 || Faria (4–3) || Tropeano (4–6) || — || 9,132 || 55–53 || W2
|-style="background:#bfb"
| 109 || August 2 || Angels || 4–2 || Beeks (1–1) || Heaney (6–7) || Romo (13) || 10,988 || 56–53 || W3
|-style="background:#fbb"
| 110 || August 3 || White Sox || 2–3 (10) || Danish (1–0) || Alvarado (1–4) || Santiago (1) || 16,144 || 56–54 || L1
|-style="background:#fbb"
| 111 || August 4 || White Sox || 1–2 || Cedeño (2–0) || Chirinos (0–4) || Vieira (1) || 21,214 || 56–55 || L2
|-style="background:#fbb"
| 112 || August 5 || White Sox || 7–8 || Santiago (4–3) || Castillo (2–2) || — || 14,739 || 56–56 || L3
|-style="background:#bfb"
| 113 || August 7 || Orioles || 4–3 || Romo (2–2) || Castro (2–6) || — || 11,734 || 57–56 || W1
|-style="background:#fbb"
| 114 || August 8 || Orioles || 4–5 || Wright Jr. (3–0) || Romo (2–3) || Givens (3) || 9,474 || 57–57 || L1
|-style="background:#bfb"
| 115 || August 9 || Orioles || 5–4 || Chirinos (1–4) || Carroll (0–1) || Romo (14) || 10,254 || 58–57 || W1
|-style="background:#bfb"
| 116 || August 10 || @ Blue Jays || 7–0 || Snell (13–5) || Estrada (5–9) || — || 23,082 || 59–57 || W2
|-style="background:#bfb"
| 117 || August 11 || @ Blue Jays || 3–1 || Castillo (3–2) || Gaviglio (2–5) || Romo (15) || 38,797 || 60–57 || W3
|-style="background:#fbb"
| 118 || August 12 || @ Blue Jays || 1–2 || García (3–6) || Alvarado (1–5) || Giles (13) || 33,746 || 60–58 || L1
|-style="background:#fbb"
| 119 || August 14 || @ Yankees || 1–4 || Happ (13–6) || Wood (0–1) || Chapman (31) || 40,393 || 60–59 || L2
|-style="background:#bfb"
| 120 || August 15 || @ Yankees || 6–1 || Yarbrough (11–5) || Cessa (1–3) || — || 42,716 || 61–59 || W1
|-style="background:#bfb"
| 121 || August 16 || @ Yankees || 3–1 || Snell (14–5) || Tanaka (9–4) || Kolarek (1) || 41,033 || 62–59 || W2
|-style="background:#fbb"
| 122 || August 17 || @ Red Sox || 3–7 || Johnson (4–3) || Chirinos (1–5) || — || 37,012 || 62–60 || L1
|-style="background:#fbb"
| 123 || August 18 || @ Red Sox || 2–5 || Price (13–6) || Glasnow (1–3) || Kimbrel (37) || 36,654 || 62–61 || L2
|-style="background:#bfb"
| 124 || August 19 || @ Red Sox || 2–0 || Beeks (2–1) || Velázquez (7–1) || Romo (16) || 37,242 || 63–61 || W1
|-style="background:#bfb"
| 125 || August 20 || Royals || 1–0 || Yarbrough (12–5) || López (0–3) || Alvarado (5) || 10,036 || 64–61 || W2
|-style="background:#bfb"
| 126 || August 21 || Royals || 4–1 || Snell (15–5) || Sparkman (0–2) || Romo (17) || 9,402 || 65–61 || W3
|-style="background:#bfb"
| 127 || August 22 || Royals || 6–3 || Chirinos (2–5) || Junis (6–12) || Romo (18) || 8,686 || 66–61 || W4
|-style="background:#bfb"
| 128 || August 23 || Royals || 4–3 || Romo (3–3) || Flynn (3–5) || — || 9,088 || 67–61 || W5
|-style="background:#bfb"
| 129 || August 24 || Red Sox || 10–3 || Beeks (3–1) || Velázquez (7–2) || — || 19,723 || 68–61 || W6
|-style="background:#bfb"
| 130 || August 25 || Red Sox || 5–1 || Stanek (2–3) || Porcello (15–7) || — || 25,695 || 69–61 || W7
|-style="background:#bfb"
| 131 || August 26 || Red Sox || 9–1 || Snell (16–5) || Eovaldi (5–6) || — || 23,448 || 70–61 || W8
|-style="background:#fbb"
| 132 || August 28 || @ Braves || 5–9 || Brach (2–3) || Roe (1–3) || — || 21,216 || 70–62 || L1
|-style="background:#bfb"
| 133 || August 29 || @ Braves || 8–5 || Beeks (4–1) || Newcomb (11–7) || Alvarado (6) || 20,876 || 71–62 || W1
|-style="background:#fbb"
| 134 || August 31 || @ Indians || 0–3 || Kluber (17–7) || Glasnow (1–4) || Hand (31) || 25,639 || 71–63 || L1
|-

|-style="background:#bfb"
| 135 || September 1 || @ Indians || 5–3 || Snell (17–5) || Bieber (8–3) || Kolarek (2) || 31,816 || 72–63 || W1
|-style="background:#bfb"
| 136 || September 2 || @ Indians || 6–4 || Yarbrough (13–5) || Carrasco (16–8) || Alvarado (7) || 26,535 || 73–63 || W2
|-style="background:#bfb"
| 137 || September 3 || @ Blue Jays || 7–1 || Chirinos (3–5) || Stroman (4–9) || — || 18,034 || 74–63 || W3
|-style="background:#bfb"
| 138 || September 4 || @ Blue Jays || 4–0 || Wood (1–1) || Borucki (3–4) || Romo (19) || 17,594 || 75–63 || W4
|-style="background:#fbb"
| 139 || September 5 || @ Blue Jays || 3–10 || Sanchez (4–5) || Glasnow (1–5) || — || 17,872 || 75–64 || L1
|-style="background:#bfb"
| 140 || September 7 || Orioles || 14–2 || Snell (18–5) || Bundy (7–14) || — || 12,436 || 76–64 || W1
|-style="background:#bfb"
| 141 || September 8 || Orioles || 10–5 || Yarbrough (14–5) || Hess (3–10) || — || 10,275 || 77–64 || W2
|-style="background:#bfb"
| 142 || September 9 || Orioles || 8–3 || Chirinos (4–5) || Rogers (1–2) || — || 13,632 || 78–64 || W3
|-style="background:#bfb"
| 143 || September 10 || Indians || 6–5 || Schultz (2–0) || Hand (2–5) || — || 12,724 || 79–64 || W4
|-style="background:#fbb"
| 144 || September 11 || Indians || 0–2 || Bieber (10–3) || Glasnow (1–6) || Allen (27) || 10,599 || 79–65 || L1
|-style="background:#bfb"
| 145 || September 12 || Indians || 3–1 || Snell (19–5) || Carrasco (16–9) || Alvarado (8) || 10,654 || 80–65 || W1
|-style="background:#fbb"
| 146 || September 14 || Athletics || 1–2 (10) || Treinen (7–2) || Schultz (2–1) || — || 11,549 || 80–66 || L1
|-style="background:#bfb"
| 147 || September 15 || Athletics || 7–5 || Kittredge (2–2) || Familia (8–6) || Romo (20) || 15,154 || 81–66 || W1
|-style="background:#bfb"
| 148 || September 16 || Athletics || 5–4 || Kittredge (3–2) || Fiers (12–7) || Romo (21) || 13,197 || 82–66 || W2
|-style="background:#bfb"
| 149 || September 17 || @ Rangers || 3–0 || Glasnow (2–6) || Sampson (0–2) || Romo (22) || 21,840 || 83–66 || W3
|-style="background:#bfb"
| 150 || September 18 || @ Rangers || 4–0 || Snell (20–5) || Gallardo (8–6) || — || 23,523 || 84–66 || W4
|-style="background:#bfb"
| 151 || September 19 || @ Rangers || 9–3 || Yarbrough (15–5) || Méndez (2–2) || — || 25,168 || 85–66 || W5
|-style="background:#fbb"
| 152 || September 20 || @ Blue Jays || 8–9 || Paulino (1–0) || Romo (3–4) || — || 19,478 || 85–67 || L1
|-style="background:#bfb"
| 153 || September 21 || @ Blue Jays || 11–3 || Beeks (5–1) || Reid-Foley (2–4) || Pruitt (3) || 21,167 || 86–67 || W1
|-style="background:#fbb"
| 154 || September 22 || @ Blue Jays || 2–5 || Pannone (4–1) || Glasnow (2–7) || Giles (24) || 27,648 || 86–68 || L1
|-style="background:#bfb"
| 155 || September 23 || @ Blue Jays || 5–2 || Snell (21–5) || Borucki (4–5) || Romo (23) || 23,944 || 87–68 || W1
|-style="background:#fbb"
| 156 || September 24 || Yankees || 1–4 || Gray (11–9) || Yarbrough (15–6) || Britton (7) || 13,832 || 87–69 || L1
|-style="background:#fbb"
| 157 || September 25 || Yankees || 2–9 || Severino (19–8) || Faria (4–4) || — || 10,953 || 87–70 || L2
|-style="background:#bfb"
| 158 || September 26 || Yankees || 8–7 || Chirinos (5–5) || Tanaka (12–6) || Romo (24) || 11,325 || 88–70 || W1
|-style="background:#fbb"
| 159 || September 27 || Yankees || 1–12 || Sabathia (9–7) || Schultz (2–2) || — || 12,349 || 88–71 || L1
|-style="background:#fbb"
| 160 || September 28 || Blue Jays || 6–7 || Mayza (2–0) || Alvarado (1–6) || Giles (26) || 12,061 || 88–72 || L2
|-style="background:#bfb"
| 161 || September 29 || Blue Jays || 4–3 || Castillo (4–2) || Borucki (4–6) || Romo (25) || 13,221 || 89–72 || W1
|-style="background:#bfb"
| 162 || September 30 || Blue Jays || 9–4 || Yarbrough (16–6) || Gaviglio (3–10) || Pruitt (4) || 13,313 || 90–72 || W2
|-

|- style="text-align:center;"
| Legend:       = Win       = Loss       = PostponementBold = Rays team member

Roster

Farm system

References

External links
Tampa Bay Rays 2018 Schedule at MLB.com
2018 Tampa Bay Rays season at ESPN
2018 Tampa Bay Rays season at Baseball Reference

Tampa Bay Rays season
Tampa Bay Rays
Tampa Bay Rays seasons